Jews for Racial and Economic Justice (JFREJ) is an American left-wing non-profit grassroots Jewish organization. JFREJ describes itself as a "movement to dismantle racism and economic exploitation" and is based in New York City. It operates both a 501(c)(3), also known as JFREJ Community and a 501(c)(4) known as JFREJ Action.

History
JFREJ was founded in New York City in 1990. Melanie Kaye/Kantrowitz served as the organization's first director. The creation of JFREJ was inspired by Nelson Mandela's 1990 visit to New York City, during which many local Jewish groups and leaders, including the American Jewish Congress and the Anti-Defamation League, snubbed Mandela due to his support for the Palestinian cause. JFREJ's first event, held on 15 June 1990, honored Nelson Mandela and raised $50,000 for the anti-apartheid cause.

During the Trump administration, JFREJ was active in the movement to Abolish ICE.

In 2019, Alexandria Ocasio-Cortez spoke at a JFREJ event where she discussed her Puerto Rican ancestors' distant Sephardi Jewish heritage.

JFREJ is critical of calls for more security as a way to counter the growth of violent antisemitism in the United States, citing the concerns of Black Jews and other Jews of color that security would not make them safer and would increase racial profiling.

In June 2022, the Anti-Defamation League condemned JFREJ as "out of touch" with mainstream Jewish-American opinion. The ADL's CEO Jonathan Greenblatt retweeted a Twitter thread singling out JFREJ and the Jewish Vote as a "far-left scam". An ADL spokesperson later confirmed the organization's agreement with the sentiment that JFREJ isn't representative of Jewish opinion or Jewish values. Sophie Ellman-Golan, communications director for JFREJ, criticized the ADL for attacking the Jewish identity of JFREJ members.

The Jewish Vote
The Jewish Vote is the electoral arm of Jews for Racial & Economic Justice Action. Their goal is to endorse and help elect a new generation of "reformers and radicals" who will fight for Medicare for All, universal rent control, a Green New Deal, publicly funded elections, fair wages and working conditions for all, and an end to mass incarceration and criminalization of people of color.

See also
Beyond the Pale (radio program)

References

External links
Jews for Economic and Racial Justice, official website
Anti-Semitism Training with JFREJ, ResourceGeneration.org

Jewish anti-racism
Jewish anti-occupation groups
Jewish socialism
Jewish organizations based in New York City
Opposition to antisemitism in the United States
Socialism in New York (state)
1990 establishments in the United States